Amethystea is a genus of plants in the  Lamiaceae, first described for modern science by Linnaeus in 1753. It has only one known species, Amethystea caerulea, commonly known as blue amethystea, native to China, Japan, Korea, Central Asia (Tibet, Xinjiang, Kazakhstan, Tajikistan, Kyrgyzstan), and parts of Russia (Altai, Chita, Irkutsk, Buryatiya, Primorye).

References 

Lamiaceae
Monotypic Lamiaceae genera
Flora of China
Flora of Japan
Flora of Kazakhstan
Flora of Korea
Flora of Kyrgyzstan
Flora of Russia
Flora of Tajikistan
Taxa named by Carl Linnaeus